Ryan Knowles (born December 12, 1978 in California) is an American actor, singer, comedian, writer, television host, speech coach and motivational speaker.

Life

Knowles was born and grew up in Orange County, California.  He lives in New York City. In addition to performing, Knowles is a motivational speaker and speech and performance coach for students, politicians and business leaders.

New York Theatre
On October 16, 2020, Knowles made his Broadway debut in The Lightning Thief for a Limited 16-week Engagement at the Longacre Theatre. Playing 9 characters with 25 quick changes, the New York Times included his performance in their "Best Of Theatre 2019" list.

Off-Broadway, Knowles appeared in the award-winning topical revue NEWSical:The Musical at Theatre Row's Kirk Theatre, alongside stars Christine Pedi, Michael West, Christina Bianco, Tommy Walker and guest stars Perez Hilton, Andrea McArdle, Cheri Oteri and Carson Kressley, among others.

Knowles has appeared in the Radio City Christmas Spectacular at Radio City Music Hall and in other projects with the Rockettes.

Knowles wrote and performed his solo show "DIG & BE DUG: The Gospel of Lord Buckley" for the Planet Connections Theatre Festival in Summer 2010.  His performance as the now-forgotten jazz comedian Lord Buckley garnered critical acclaim and won Knowles the awards for "Best Solo Show" and "Best Performance in a Solo Show."

In spring 2010, he starred as the perverted and tyrannical Roman Emperor Caligula in Randy Weiner's (The Donkey Show) and Alfred Preisser's debaucherous Caligula Maximus, a new circus/musical/extravaganza at La MaMa ETC in the Ellen Stewart Theatre, to great critical acclaim.

In 2006, Knowles starred as "Prospero" in the new musical, Tempest at the Cherry Lane Theatre in New York City.  He adapted the text from Shakespeare's original and co-wrote the book with Daniel Neiden, working from a concept by Tony-winning book writer Thomas Meehan.

Knowles appeared in the New York premiere of the new mystery Hound portraying Sherlock Holmes, a role which won him the award for Outstanding Performance by a Supporting Actor at the Planet Connections Theatre Festival.

In 2005, he starred as "Nick Bottom" for over a year of performances at the Manhattan Ensemble Theatre in Soho in the hit 1950's-style musical version of Shakespeare's A Midsummer Night's Dream, Fools In Love.

National Tours
Prior to playing Broadway, Knowles played the same roles in the First National Tour of The Lightning Thief for 9 months.

Knowles spent a year on the North American leg of the 2013/2014 World Tour of We Will Rock You!. the worldwide smash-hit musical by Queen and Ben Elton.  Knowles originated the role of "Buddy," a lovable stoner in the vein of Cheech & Chong; a cross between Hans Solo and Willie Nelson, a Bohemian Rebel Leader, for the wonderfully silly, futuristic rock saga.  Ben Elton, the book writer, and director of the production, wrote the part in rehearsals to be tailor-made for Knowles.

Knowles performed in the North American tours of the Broadway production of Dr. Seuss' How the Grinch Stole Christmas! in 2011 and 2010, playing the role of "Grandpa Who" and "Grinch u/s."

In winter 2009, Knowles toured the country in Todrick Hall's Oz the Musical as "Brenda," the "Wicked Witch of the West Side," alongside Vonzell Solomon of American Idol, Aundrea Fimbres of Danity Kane, and Orlando Brown of Disney's That's So Raven.

Writing
Knowles has written stand-up, sketch comedies, short stories, 6 plays and 2 musicals, including "DIG & BE DUG: The Gospel of Lord Buckley," "Nick Bottom's Extravaganza!," "The Tempest: The Musical.”

Television
In 2006, Knowles was brought on as the Host of Nickelodeon's daily live show ME:TV.

Film
In 2008, Knowles filmed his first feature, Camp Hell, a supernatural thriller from Holedigger Films.  The film also stars Academy Award-nominee Bruce Davison, Emmy-winner Dana Delany and Jesse Eisenberg. The film had a 2011 theatrical release.

Speech Coaching
In addition to performing, Knowles is a speech coach and political consultant.  He has worked as a speechwriter and debate/vocal coach for numerous local and state candidates nationwide.  Also, Knowles is one of the country's foremost consultants in Speech and Interpretive Performance for competitive high school students.  He is employed by a number of top high school programs, both public and private, on both coasts. Knowles is the co-founder (with David Kraft) of Interprod Performance Studies Institute in Boston, Massachusetts; a summer intensive program for gifted young performers.  This line of work was inspired by Knowles' success as a high school and collegiate speech and debate competitor, during which time he won numerous State and National Championships, as well as becoming the first American in history to win a World Championship at the 2000 World Universities Debate Association Championship Tournament at the University of Glasgow in Scotland.

Critical Acclaim

Elizabeth Vincentelli wrote in The New York Times "Best of Theatre 2019": "The Lighting Thief harbors a hilarious gem — or rather many, all courtesy of Ryan Knowles. Perched on long, angular legs, Knowles handles several parts in grand Looney Tunes style. What’s most striking is his vocal versatility: He can go down to chthonic depths when playing a centaur, for instance, yet for Hades, he models his grandiosely arch line readings after Paul Lynde’s."

Dan Aucoin wrote in the Boston Globe: "But my favorite in the cast is the deep-voiced, utterly hilarious Ryan Knowles. I’m sure none of the young people inside the Huntington Avenue Theatre know who Lynde was, but [his voice] cracked me up. I guess “The Lightning Thief’’ has something for everybody."

The New Yorker writes: "The rubber-limbed, vocally dexterous Ryan Knowles, in multiple roles, [is] a scene-stealer of the highest order."

Théoden Janes wrote in the Charlotte Observer: "Knowles is a chameleonic standout who threatens to steal the show!"

Em Skow wrote in DC Metro: "[A] scene stealer every time he stepped, wheeled, or galloped on stage. His remarkable range of intricately-layered personas were fascinating to watch unfold and were always perfectly balanced on the edge of ridiculous and delightful, for adults and kids alike.

Tim Smith wrote in the Baltimore Sun: "Ryan Knowles steals the show time and again with his comic sparks as Buddy, a fuzzy-headed Bohemian."

Dan Aucoin wrote in the Boston Globe: "Ryan Knowles delivers a standout performance.

Clifford Johnson III wrote in Backstage, "[The Producers] wisest decision is in the casting of Ryan Knowles.  He carries the entire production on his slim shoulders, imbuing [it] with charisma, intelligence, tenderness, and a sense of irony."

Dan Bacalzo wrote on TheatreMania.com, "Knowles takes control of the stage...[he] has a dynamic presence and an appropriately seedy charisma.  He also has a deep baritone which he utilizes to good effect."

Mark Roberson writes on NYTheatre.com, "Ryan Knowles is perfect.  Made up as a Jagger-Hedwig hybrid, Knowles moves between his songs and speeches with ease, hitting all the right moments.  We are enthralled..with him, and always interested."

Jason Clark writes in Slant Magazine, "Playing the titular self-created deity with a cheeky, pervy, party-boy hauteur, not unlike Cabaret's furtive Emcee, the brave, highly attention-catching Ryan Knowles lords over a most unruly evening."

Lauren Wissot writes on TheatreOnline.com, "The Mick Jagger-resembling Ryan Knowles [is] a charismatic performer who has both played villains and done time as a Nickelodeon TV show host...[He] is one big, punk rock smackdown answer to sissy hippie 'Hair.'"

Mark Blankenship wrote in Variety: "For sheer solo star power, however, no one tops Ryan Knowles as Bottom. The dexterity in his voice is astonishing, gliding from a twitter to wall-shattering thunder. His body contorts into countless postures of clownish arrogance without signs of effort. His fluidity and precision make him captivating to watch, suggesting he has a major career in the making."

The New Yorker proclaimed: “Ryan Knowles steals the show with his braying, rubber-limbed portrayal of the vainglorious Bottom. His thundering voice, relentless moue-making, and mammoth charisma are a cartoony cocktail of Jim Carrey and Snagglepuss, with a little speed thrown in.”

Barbara and Scott Siegel wrote Theatermania.com: "Ryan Knowles is simply a dynamo of talent as Bottom; a combination of a young Peter O'Toole and Jim Carrey, he can seemingly do anything with his voice and his body...[A performer] so electric that you know you are catching [a] future star early in [his] career."

Mark Dundas Wood wrote in Backstage: “You’ll have to stop to applaud the gifted Ryan Knowles, perhaps the lankiest actor ever to play the role of Bottom.  Knowles has a voice that fairly booms and a face that stretches like Dubble Bubble.  He seems to have stepped out of lost footage from cartoonist Tex Avery.”

References

External links and further reading
 
 
 Official Trailer for "CALIGULA MAXIMUS"
 Full Review: Theatremania, "Fools In Love"
 Theatre footage of Ryan Knowles as The Genie on YouTube
 Planet Connections Theatre Festivity Awards
 "Caligula Maximus" Website
 "DIG & BE DUG: The Gospel of Lord Buckley" Show Web Site

American male stage actors
American male film actors
Television personalities from California
1978 births
Living people
Actors from Whittier, California
Musicians from Whittier, California
Writers from Whittier, California